Tiago Miguel Gonçalves Mendes (born 19 July 1992) is a Portuguese footballer  who plays for S.C. Covilhã, as a forward.

Football career
On 27 July 2014, Mendes made his professional debut with Sporting Covilhã in a 2014–15 Taça da Liga match against Freamunde.

References

External links

Stats and profile at LPFP 

1992 births
Living people
Footballers from Lisbon
Portuguese footballers
Association football forwards
S.C. Covilhã players